USS Miss Toledo (SP-1711) was a United States Navy patrol vessel acquired for a few months in 1918.

Miss Toledo was built in 1917 by the Dachel-Carter Shipbuilding Corporation at Benton Harbor, Michigan. On 30 April 1918, the U.S. Navy acquired her under a free lease from her owner, R. M. Ellery of Toledo, Ohio, for use as a section patrol boat during World War I. She was assigned the section patrol number SP-1711.

Although presumably acquired for patrol work on the Great Lakes, Miss Toledo apparently saw no active naval service. The Navy returned her to Ellery on 14 December 1918.

See also 
 Other Ships built by Dachel-Carter Shipbuilding Corporation:
 USS Bobolink (AMS-2)
 USS Bunting (AMS-3)

Notes

References

Department of the Navy Naval History and Heritage Command Online Library of Selected Images: Civilian Ships: Miss Toledo (Motor Boat, 1917). Taken over by the Navy in 1918
NavSource Online: Section Patrol Craft Photo Archive Miss Toledo (SP 1711)

Patrol vessels of the United States Navy
World War I patrol vessels of the United States
Ships built in Benton Harbor, Michigan
1917 ships
Great Lakes ships
Ships built by the Dachel-Carter Shipbuilding Corporation